Ivan Delić can refer to:
 Ivan Delić (Croatian footballer) (born 1998), currently playing for NK Varaždin
 Ivan Delić (Montenegrin footballer) (born 1986), former footballer